Albert Weiblen (1857–1957) was a German-born American architect and sculptor. His company, the Albert Weiblen Marble & Granite Company, was based in New Orleans and specialized in monuments and burial structures.

Life and career
Weiblen was born in Metzingen, Württemberg in 1857. He immigrated to the United States in 1883, arrived in New Orleans two years later and worked as a sculptor for Kursheedt and Bienvenu.  By 1888, he established his own marble yard and showroom, eventually incorporating his operations as the Albert Weiblen Marble & Granite Company.

The Weiblen company operated a large quarry in Stone Mountain, Georgia. Day-to-day work at the quarry was initially overseen by Weiblen himself, though he later hired Italian sculptor Theodore Bottinelli. The firm served New Orleans patrons primarily, as well as many other parts of the South. Weiblen operated a showroom in New Orleans at 116 City Park Avenue. Most of Weiblen's monuments were of Amphiprostyle design.

After Weiblen's death at the age of 99, his daughter in law Norma Merritt Weiblen took up company operations. In 1969, Weiblen Marble & Granite was sold to Stewart Enterprises. The Weiblen company papers are now divided across the Southeastern Architectural Archive at Tulane University and the Earl K. Long Library at the University of New Orleans.

Famous works
Tomb of Lodge No.30 of the Benevolent and Protective Order of Elks, Greenwood Cemetery, New Orleans, 1912
William G. Helis, Sr. mausoleum, Metairie Cemetery, New Orleans, nd
P.G.T. Beauregard Monument, New Orleans, 1913 (removed early morning hours of 17 May 2017)
Tomb of Josie Arlington, Metairie Cemetery, New Orleans, 1914
Thomas Egleston Monument, Atlanta, 1918
Tombs of Joseph and Lucca Vaccaro, Metairie Cemetery, New Orleans, 1920's
Downman Tomb, Metairie Cemetery, New Orleans, 1920

References

Sources
Albert Weiblen biography
Weiblen Company's Drawings

19th-century American architects
1857 births
1957 deaths
German emigrants to the United States
Architects from New Orleans
20th-century American sculptors
20th-century American male artists
19th-century American sculptors
American male sculptors
19th-century American male artists
20th-century American architects